Henry Viscardi Jr. (1912-2004) was an American disability rights advocate who championed the cause of equality and employment of disabled people in workforce. In 1952, on Eleanor Roosevelt's advice, he founded Abilities, Inc. which has now expanded to the Viscardi Center - a non-profit organization and global leader advocating for the empowerment of people with disabilities. To provide equal educational opportunities to children with disabilities of all ages, he founded the Human Resources School in Albertson, New York in 1952, which was later renamed the Henry Viscardi School in his honor. He served as advisor to several US presidents bringing many policy changes in the disability sector. He is also the author of the book Give Us The Tools. In his honour, the Viscardi Center in 2013 started the Henry Viscardi Achievement Awards to identify and recognize exemplary leaders from the disability community.

See also
 Viscardi Center
 Henry Viscardi School
 Henry Viscardi Achievement Awards

References

External links
 The Viscardi Center

American disability rights activists
American people with disabilities
1912 births
2004 deaths